, known as Shiga Lin, is a Hong Kong singer and actress.

Lin was signed to Warner Music Group Hong Kong from 2010 to June 2017, HMV MUSIC from June 2017 to December 2018, and The Voice Entertainment Group（Now known as TVB Music Group）from December 2018 to present.

Discography
Moment (2010)
Movin' On (2012)
Once Said (2014)
大了一歲 (One Year Older) (2015)

Filmography

Films

Television dramas

References

External links
 Official website 
 
 Shiga Lin on Sina Weibo
 Shiga Lin on Instagram
 Shiga Lin on Facebook
 Shiga Lin Si-Nga at lovehkfilm.com

1988 births
Living people
21st-century Hong Kong women singers
Hong Kong film actresses
Cantopop singers
Hong Kong television actresses